L'Anarchie (anarchy) was a French individualist anarchist journal established in April 1905 by Albert Libertad.  Along with Libertad, contributors to the journal included Émile Armand, André Lorulot, Émilie Lamotte, Raymond Callemin, and Victor Serge). The magazine was based in Paris.

484 editions were published between 13 April 1905 and 22 July 1914.

On 21 April 1926 Louis Louvet relaunched L'Anarchie, which appeared until 1929.

Founding 

L'Anarchie was founded by Albert Libertad in 1905, with the first issue appearing on April 13. Libertad was a more militant anarchist, urging individuals to rebel, instead of the more common idea of a social revolution. L'Anarchie was against Anarcho-syndicalism and the traditional anarchism of Kropotkin or Bakunin, believing in the act of rebelling as individuals rather than the utopian egalitarian society most Anarcho-Syndicalists fight for.

Émile Armand said in an interview that "[Libertad] knew of Stirner and Nietzsche. One was not concerned with a future society always promised and which never came; the economic and social point of view was put to the side. Individualism was a permanent struggle between the individual and their surroundings, the negation of authority, law and exploitation an its corollary, authority."

References

External links
Entire editions of numbers of L'Anarchie

 l'anarchie, Paris, 13 April 1905
 l'anarchie, Paris, 20 April 1905
 l'anarchie, Paris, 27 April 1905
 l'anarchie, Paris, 4 May 1905
 l'anarchie, Paris, 11 May 1905
l'anarchie, Paris, 18 May 1905
l'anarchie, Paris, 25 May 1905
l'anarchie, Paris, 1 June 1905
l'anarchie, Paris, 8 June 1905
l'anarchie, Paris, 15 June 1905
l'anarchie, Paris, 22 June 1905
l'anarchie, Paris, 29 June 1905
l'anarchie, Paris, 6 July 1905
l'anarchie, Paris, 13 July 1905
l'anarchie, Paris, 20 July 1905
l'anarchie, Paris, 27 July 1905
l'anarchie, Paris, 3 August 1905
l'anarchie, Paris, 10 August 1905
l'anarchie, Paris, 17 August 1905
l'anarchie, Paris, 24 August 1905
l'anarchie, Paris, 31 August 1905
l'anarchie, Paris, 7 September 1905
l'anarchie, Paris, 14 September 1905
l'anarchie, Paris, 21 September 1905
l'anarchie, Paris, 28 September 1905
l'anarchie, Paris, 5 October 1905
l'anarchie, Paris, 12 October 1905
l'anarchie, Paris, 19 October 1905
l'anarchie, Paris, 26 October 1905
l'anarchie, Paris, 2 November 1905
l'anarchie, Paris, 9 November 1905
l'anarchie, Paris, 16 November 1905
l'anarchie, Paris, 23 November 1905
l'anarchie, Paris, 30 November 1905
l'anarchie, Paris, 7 December 1905
l'anarchie, Paris, 14 December 1905
l'anarchie, Paris, 21 December 1905
l'anarchie, Paris, 28 December 1905

Articles from L'Anarchie
 Some articles can be found on wikisource
 L’illusion révolutionnaire (L’anarchie n°264, 28 April 1910)
 L’ouvriérisme (L’anarchie, 24 March 1910)
 La grève des cheminots (L’anarchie, 20 October 1910)

1905 establishments in France
1914 disestablishments in France
Defunct political magazines published in France
Anarchist periodicals published in France
French-language magazines
Individualist anarchist publications
Magazines established in 1905
Magazines disestablished in 1914
Magazines published in Paris